Ken Hammond may refer to:

 Ken Hammond (historian), professor of history at New Mexico State University
 Ken Hammond (ice hockey) (born 1963), Canadian ice hockey player
 Ken Hammond (newsreader), Irish newsreader.